Pareupogona is a genus of parasitic flies in the family Tachinidae.

Species
Pareupogona oblonga Townsend, 1916

Distribution
Australia.

References

Diptera of Australasia
Exoristinae
Tachinidae genera
Taxa named by Charles Henry Tyler Townsend